Katherine Preston is a British writer and public speaker. Her work has appeared in a number of publications, including the Daily Telegraph, Psychology Today, and Salon.

Preston graduated with a degree in History from Durham University in 2005. She worked in asset management before moving to America to write a memoir on her experiences as a stutterer. The book, Out With It: How Stuttering Helped Me Find My Voice, was published by Simon & Schuster in 2013.

References

Living people
21st-century English women writers
English memoirists
Alumni of Hatfield College, Durham
Year of birth missing (living people)
21st-century English writers